Creole is an album by David Murray released on the Canadian Justin Time label. Recorded in 1997 and released in 1998 the album features performances by Murray with Michel Cilla, Max Cilla, Ray Drummond, Billy Hart, D.D. Jackson, Klod Kiavue, François Landreseau, Gérard Lockel and James Newton.

Reception
The Allmusic review by Tim Sheridan awarded the album 3 stars stating "Celebrating the Caribbean spirit through bold rhythms and atonal experiment, this disc is for the most part an intriguing effort. While the "noodling" is not for everyone's taste, there are many beautiful moments throughout.".

Track listing 
 "Gété" (Kavue) - 6:00
 "Flor Na Paul" (Teofilo Chantre) - 8:40
 "Guadeloupe Sunrise" (Murray) - 5:50
 "Soma Tour" (Max Cilla) - 7:26
 "Savon de Toilette" (Landresau) - 4:53
 "Gansavan'n" (Kavue) - 9:15
 "Mona" (Murray) - 9:59
 "Guadeloupe After Dark" (Lockel) - 4:59
 "Tonte Vontarde" (Chantre) - 7:27

 Recorded October 19 & 20, 1997 in Martinique

Personnel 
 David Murray - tenor saxophone, bass clarinet
 Michel Cilla - dibass drum, voice
 Max Cilla - alto flute des mornes
 Ray Drummond - bass 
 Billy Hart - drums
 D. D. Jackson - piano
 Klod Kiavue - ka drum, percussion and voice
 François Landreseau - ka drum and voice (on track 05) 
 Gérard Lockel - guitar
 James Newton - flute

References 

1998 albums
David Murray (saxophonist) albums
Justin Time Records albums